Pogonocherus fasciculatus is a species of beetle in the family Cerambycidae. It was described by Charles De Geer in 1775, originally under the genus Cerambyx. It has a wide distribution throughout Europe.

Subspecies
 Pogonocherus fasciculatus fasciculatus (DeGeer, 1775)
 Pogonocherus fasciculatus hondoensis Ohbayashi, 1963

References

Pogonocherini
Beetles described in 1775
Taxa named by Charles De Geer